General Sir John Monash,  (27 June 1865 – 8 October 1931) was an Australian civil engineer and military commander of the First World War. He commanded the 13th Infantry Brigade before the war and then, shortly after its outbreak, became commander of the 4th Brigade in Egypt, with whom he took part in the Gallipoli campaign. In July 1916 he took charge of the newly raised 3rd Division in northwestern France and in May 1918 became commander of the Australian Corps, at the time the largest corps on the Western Front. Monash is considered one of the best Allied generals of the First World War and the most famous commander in Australian history.

Early life

Monash was born in Dudley Street, West Melbourne, Victoria, on 27 June 1865, the son of Louis Monash and his wife Bertha, née Manasse. He was born to Jewish parents, both from Krotoschin in the Prussian province of Posen (now Krotoszyn, Poland); the family name was originally spelt Monasch and pronounced with the emphasis on the second syllable. The family spoke German as their native language. As might have been expected from a man brought up by cultivated German parents who had arrived in Australia barely two years before John's birth, Monash spoke, read, and wrote German fluently. However, from 1914 until his death, he had no good reason to attract attention to his German background.

In 1874, the family moved to the small town of Jerilderie in the Riverina region of New South Wales, where his father ran a store. Monash later claimed to have met the bushranger Ned Kelly during his raid there in 1879. Monash attended the state school and his intelligence was recognised. The family was advised to move back to Melbourne to let John reach his full potential, which they did in 1877. Although his parents had largely abandoned religious practice, Monash celebrated his Bar Mitzvah at the East Melbourne Hebrew Congregation and sang in its choir. He was educated under Alexander Morrison at Scotch College, Melbourne, where he passed the matriculation examination when only 14 years of age. At age 16, he was dux of the school. He graduated from the University of Melbourne: a Master of Engineering in 1893; a Bachelor of Arts and Bachelor of Laws in 1895, and a Doctor of Engineering in 1921.

On 8 April 1891, Monash married Hannah Victoria Moss (1871–1920), and their only child, Bertha, was born in 1893. Monash had previously engaged in an affair with Annie Gabriel, the wife of one of his colleagues, which ended as an active matter after his conscious choice of 'Vic' for marriage (though communication continued many years afterwards). He worked as a civil engineer, and played a major role in introducing reinforced concrete to Australian engineering practice. He initially worked for private contractors on bridge and railway construction, and as their advocate in contract arbitrations. Following a period with the Melbourne Harbor Trust, in 1894 he entered into partnership with J. T. N. Anderson as consultants and contractors. When the partnership was dissolved in 1905 he joined with the builder David Mitchell and industrial chemist John Gibson to form the Reinforced Concrete & Monier Pipe Construction Co, and in 1906 with them and businessmen from South Australia, to form the S. A. Reinforced Concrete Co. He took a leading part in his profession and became president of the Victorian Institute of Engineers and a member of the Institution of Civil Engineers, London.

Monash joined the university company of the militia in 1884, and he became a lieutenant in the North Melbourne battery on 5 April 1887. He was promoted to captain in 1895 and in April 1897 was promoted to major and given command of the battery. On 7 March 1908, he was promoted to lieutenant-colonel in the intelligence corps. He was given command of the 13th Infantry Brigade in 1912, and was promoted colonel on 1 July 1913.

First World War

Gallipoli

When the First World War broke out in August 1914, Monash became a full-time army officer, accepting an appointment as the chief censor in Australia. Monash did not enjoy the job, and was keen for a field command. In September, after the Australian Imperial Force was formed, he was appointed as the commander of the 4th Infantry Brigade, which consisted of four battalions: the 13th, 14th, 15th and 16th. His appointment was met with some protest within the military, in part due to his German and Jewish ancestry, but Monash was supported by numerous high-ranking officers, including James Legge, James McCay and Ian Hamilton, and his appointment stood.

When the first contingent of Australian troops, the 1st Division, sailed in October, the 4th Brigade remained behind. Training was undertaken at Broadmeadows, Victoria, before embarking in December 1914. After arriving in Egypt in January 1915, Monash's brigade established itself at Heliopolis, where it was assigned to the New Zealand and Australian Division under Major General Alexander Godley. After a period of training, in April, the brigade took part in the Gallipoli campaign against the Turks. Assigned the role of divisional reserve, Monash came ashore early on 26 April. The brigade initially defended the line between Pope's Hill and Courtney's Post, and the valley behind this line became known as "Monash Valley". There he made a name for himself with his independent decision-making and his organisational ability. He was promoted to brigadier general in July, although the news was marred by spiteful rumours that were passed in Cairo, Melbourne and London about him being a "German spy". His promotion was gazetted in September, with effect from 15 September 1914.

During the August offensive that was launched by the Allies to break the deadlock on the peninsula, Monash's brigade was to conduct a "left hook" to the capture of Hill 971, the highest point on the Sari Bair range. On the evening of 6/7 August, the brigade launched its attack, but poor maps, heavy resistance and the mountainous terrain defeated them. Elsewhere, the offensive also stalled, resulting in disaster for the last co-ordinated effort to defeat the Turkish forces on the Gallipoli Peninsula. By mid-August, Monash's brigade was down to just 1,400 men out of the 3,350 it had begun the campaign with. On 21 August, Monash led them in an attack on Hill 60, before it was withdrawn from the peninsula for rest. While the brigade recuperated on Lemnos, Monash took leave in Egypt, where he learned of his appointment as a Companion of the Order of the Bath. In November, the 4th Brigade returned to Gallipoli, occupying a "quiet sector" around Bauchop's Hill. Monash used his engineering knowledge to improve his brigade's position to withstand the winter, and he worked to improve the conditions that his troops would have to endure, but in mid-December the order to evacuate the peninsula came.

Monash’s time on Gallipoli and his departure from it were not, however, without controversy for reasons unrelated to the fighting. While on Gallipoli he ‘wrote very freely to his wife revealing much current information’ and ‘opened himself to the criticism that he would not keep the rules by which his juniors had strictly to adhere.’ Later, in a long diary-letter sent home by Monash and known by him to be illegal in Army terms, Monash implied that he was ‘one of the very last off Gallipoli’ whereas ‘he had left for the beach nearly five hours before the last. It was a clumsy deception as so many people knew the facts.’

Following the withdrawal from Gallipoli, Monash returned to Egypt where the AIF underwent a period of reorganisation and expansion. This process resulted in the 4th Brigade being split and providing a cadre of experienced personnel to form the 12th Brigade. It was also reassigned to the 4th Division. After a period of training, Monash's brigade undertook defensive duties along the Suez Canal. On 25 April 1916, the first anniversary of the landing at Gallipoli, while at Tel-el-Kebir, Monash and his men solemnly observed Anzac Day. Monash distributed red ribbons to soldiers present at the first landing and blue ribbons to those who came later.

Western Front

In June 1916, Monash and his command were transferred to the Western Front, being sent to the front around Armentières. On 10 July, Monash was promoted to major general and placed in command of the Australian 3rd Division. He trained the division in England with attention to detail, and after the division was sent to the Western Front in November 1916, including Messines, Broodseinde, and the First Battle of Passchendaele, with some successes, but with the usual heavy casualties. The British High Command was impressed by Monash and according to biographer Geoffery Serle, while dining with Field Marshal Sir Douglas Haig, Monash was informed that Haig "wanted him as a corps commander".

Monash's division spent the winter of 1917–1918 around Ploegsteert. Early the following year, after the Germans launched their Spring Offensive, the 3rd Division was deployed to undertake defensive operations around Amiens. Throughout April and May, the division undertook several peaceful penetration operations. Monash later described the recapture of the town of Villers-Bretonneux on 25 April 1918 after the Germans had overrun the 8th British Division under General William Heneker as the turning-point of the war. Sir Thomas William Glasgow's 13th Brigade, and Harold Elliott's 15th Brigade, were both heavily involved in the operation.

Commander of the Australian Corps

On 1 June 1918, the promotion of Monash to lieutenant general and commander of the Australian Corps, at the time the largest individual corps on the Western Front, was confirmed.

Monash’s promotion was not without contention. Among those who considered and advocated for Major General Brudenell White to have command of the Australian Corps were Australia’s Official War Correspondent and later Official Historian, Charles Bean, and journalist Keith Murdoch, although historian Justin Chadwick has written that Bean was one of many of that view.

Bean had reservations about Monash’s ‘ideals’. and was said to have a general prejudice against Monash’s Prussian Jewish background. According to Kelly, Bean’s core motivation at that time was that Brudenell White's appointment was in the best interest of the A.I.F., and that it would be a big mistake for White to leave the Australian Corps and go with Birdwood to the British Fifth Army. Historian Burness noted that Bean did recognise Monash’s ability and was not concerned that he should be promoted, but he considered Brudenell White was better fitted to command the fighting corps.
In this climate Hughes arrived at the front before the Battle of Hamel prepared to replace Monash, but after consulting with senior officers, and after seeing the superb power of planning and execution displayed by Monash, he changed his mind.

In the Official History, Charles Bean noted that Monash was more effective the higher he rose within the Army. His depth of knowledge not only of military matters, but also of engineering and business, ensured that his operational plans were the product of meticulous preparation and thorough and rigorous scrutiny.

Bean later wrote of his own ‘high intentioned but ill-judged intervention’ and that ‘those who took action (relating to Monash’s appointment) did so as I afterwards realised, without adequate appreciation of Monash, who, though his reputation as a front line soldier had been poor, was never the less a much greater man than most of us then thought.’

At the Battle of Hamel on 4 July 1918, Monash, with the support of the British 4th Army commander Sir Henry Rawlinson, commanded the 4th Australian Division, supported by the British 5th Tank Brigade, along with a detachment of American troops, to win a small but operationally significant victory for the Allies.

On 8 August 1918, the Battle of Amiens was launched. Allied troops under the command of Haig, predominantly Rawlinson's British 4th Army (consisting of the Australian Corps under Monash, Canadian Corps under Sir Arthur Currie, British III Corps under Butler and British Cavalry Corps under Kavanagh), attacked the Germans. The allied attack was spearheaded by the Australian Corps, who had been given the capture of enemy artillery as a key objective in the first phase by Monash in order to minimize the potential harm to the attacking forces. The battle was a strong, significant victory for the Allies, the first decisive win for the British Army of the war, causing the Germans to recognise that for them the War was lost. The defeated German leader, General Erich Ludendorff, described it in the following words: "August 8th was the black day of the German Army in the history of the war". These operations were just a start of a broad Allied offensive across the Western Front. On 12 August 1918, at Château de Bertangles, Monash was knighted as a Knight Commander of the Order of the Bath on the battlefield by King George V.

The Australians then achieved under Monash a series of victories against the Germans at Chuignes, Mont St Quentin, Peronne and Hargicourt. Of the battle of Mt St Quentin and the subsequent taking of the town of Peronne, Charles Bean was to write in the Official History that ‘the dash, intelligence, and persistence of the troops dealt a stunning blow to five German divisions, drove the enemy from one of its key positions in France, and took 2,600 prisoners at a cost of slightly over 3,000 casualties.’ 
Monash had 208,000 men under his command, including 50,000 inexperienced Americans. Monash planned the attack on the German defences in the Battle of the Hindenburg Line between 16 September and 5 October 1918. The Allies eventually breached the Hindenburg Line by 5 October, and the war was essentially over. On 5 October, Prinz Max von Baden, on behalf of the German Government, asked for an immediate armistice.

By the end of the war, Monash had acquired an outstanding reputation for intellect, personal magnetism, management and ingenuity. He also won the respect and loyalty of his troops: his motto was "Feed your troops on victory". Monash was regarded with great respect by the British – a British captain on the staff of William Heneker's 8th Division described Monash as "a great bullock of a man... though his manners were pleasant and his behaviour far from rough, I have seen few men who gave me such a sensation of force... a fit leader for the wild men he commanded". Field Marshal Bernard Montgomery later wrote: "I would name Sir John Monash as the best general on the western front in Europe".

For his services during the war, and in addition to his creation as a Knight Commander of the Order of the Bath, Monash was appointed as a Knight Grand Cross of the Order of St Michael and St George on 1 January 1919. He also received numerous foreign honours – the French appointed him a Grand Officer of the Légion d'honneur and awarded him the Croix de Guerre, the Belgians appointed him a Grand Officer of the Order of the Crown (Grand-Officier Ordre de la Couronne) and awarded him the Croix de Guerre, and the United States awarded him the Distinguished Service Medal. The Australian Government honoured Monash with promotion to the full rank of general explicitly “in recognition of his long and distinguished service with the Australian military forces” on 11 November 1929.

After the war

In October 1918, towards the end of the war, Australian War Historian, Charles Bean, had urged Prime Minister William Hughes to cause a plan of repatriation to be drawn up by the A. I. F. and to put Monash in charge of it. Soon after the cessation of hostilities in November 1918, Hughes requested that Monash return to London to take up the appointment as Director-General of Repatriation and Demobilisation, heading a newly-created department to carry out the repatriation of Australian troops from Europe. 

In August 1919, while in London, Monash wrote 'The Australian Victories in France in 1918' which was published in 1920. “It was propaganda, but not far off the truth.’’ and “(it) laid the groundwork for the popular narrative of ‘Monash- the-war-winner.’" Monash was, nevertheless, a noted advocate of the co-ordinated use of infantry, aircraft, artillery and tanks. As he wrote in the book:
He returned to Australia on 26 December 1919 to an enthusiastic welcome. Monash was promoted to the substantive rank of lieutenant-general on 1 January 1920 and returned to the reserves.

Shortly after his return, on 27 February 1920, Monash's wife, Vic, died of cervical cancer. Later, Monash worked in prominent civilian positions, the most notable being head of the State Electricity Commission of Victoria (SECV) from October 1920. He was also vice-chancellor of the University of Melbourne from 1923 until his death eight years later. Monash was a founding member of the Rotary Club of Melbourne, Australia's first Rotary Club, and served as its second president (1922–1923). In 1927, he became president of the newly founded Zionist Federation of Australia and New Zealand.

He was called upon by the Victorian Government of Harry Lawson in 1923 to organise "special constables" to restore order during the 1923 Victorian Police strike. He was one of the principal organisers of the annual observance of ANZAC Day and oversaw the planning for Melbourne's monumental war memorial, the Shrine of Remembrance. Monash was honoured with numerous awards and decorations from universities and foreign governments. According to his biographer Geoffrey Serle: "[i]n the 1920s Monash was broadly accepted, not just in Victoria, as the greatest living Australian".

Monash died in Melbourne on 8 October 1931 from a heart attack, and he was given a state funeral. An estimated 300,000 mourners, the nation's largest funeral crowd to that time, came to pay their respects. After a Jewish service, and a 17-gun salute, he was buried in Brighton General Cemetery. In a final sign of humility, despite his achievements, honours and titles, he instructed that his tombstone simply bear the words "John Monash". He was survived by his daughter, Bertha (1893–1979).

Legacy

Military impact 
According to British historian A. J. P. Taylor, Monash was "the only general of creative originality produced by the First World War." Monash's impact on Australian military thinking was significant in three areas. First, he was the first Australian to fully command Australian forces and he took, as following Australian commanders did, a relatively independent line with his British superiors. Second, he promoted the concept of the commander's duty to ensure the safety and well-being of his troops to a pre-eminent position in a philosophy of "collective individualism". And finally, he, along with staff officer Thomas Blamey, forcefully demonstrated the benefit of thorough planning and integration of all arms of the forces available, and of all of the components supporting the front line forces, including logistical, medical and recreational services. Troops later recounted that one of the most extraordinary things about the Battle of Hamel was not the use of armoured tanks, nor the tremendous success of the operation, but the fact that in the midst of battle Monash had arranged delivery of hot meals up to the front line.

Cultural impact 
In recognition of his enduring influence, Monash's face is on Australia's highest value currency note ($100). Monash's success in part reflected the tolerance of Australian society, but to a larger degree his success – in the harshest experience the young nation had suffered – shaped that tolerance and demonstrated to Australians that the Australian character was diverse, multi-ethnic and a blend of the traditions of the "bush" and the "city". According to author Colin MacInnes, as recounted by Monash's biographer, Geoffrey Serle, Monash's "presence and prestige...made anti-Semitism...impossible in Australia". He is also honoured in a Cantata for chorus, soloists and orchestra called Peace – A Cantata for John Monash by composer/conductor Dr David Ian Kram.

Eponyms 
 Monash University, a public research university in Victoria
 City of Monash, a local government area in Melbourne
 Division of Monash, a Federal electoral division covering part of Gippsland, Victoria
 Monash Medical Centre, a teaching hospital in Melbourne (and location of his bust, which was originally located in former SECV town Yallourn)
 Monash Freeway, a major urban freeway in Melbourne
 John Monash Scholarships, annually awarded to outstanding Australians for postgraduate study overseas
 John Monash Science School, a specialist science secondary school in Clayton, Victoria
 Town of Monash in South Australia
 Kfar Monash ("Monash village") in Israel 
 Suburb of Monash in Canberra
 Sir John Monash Stakes is a Group 3 horse race run each July at Caulfield Racecourse
 Monash Country Club in Ingleside on the Northern Beaches of Sydney
 Sir John Monash Drive in Caulfield East, Victoria
 306 Monash Army Cadet Unit 
 Sir John Monash Centre, commemorative interpretive centre at Villers-Bretonneux, France
General Monash Branch – Royal Canadian Legion (Branch #115) Winnipeg, Mb, Canada

Movement for posthumous recognition 
Since 2013, there has been a movement to posthumously promote Monash to the rank of field marshal. Monash would be the fourth person, and only second Australian-born person, to hold this rank. The movement was led by Tim Fischer, former Australian Deputy Prime Minister and author of the book, Maestro John Monash: Australia's Greatest Citizen General, and supported by other Australian Members of Parliament including Josh Frydenberg and Cathy McGowan. According to Fischer, Monash was denied promotion during his life due to discrimination, including as a result of his German-Jewish ancestry and his status as a reservist rather than professional soldier.

In October 2015, the Jerilderie Shire Council unanimously adopted the "Jerilderie Proposition", calling on the Australian Government to promote Monash:Following on the outstanding contribution of Sir John Monash to state and nation before, during and after World War I and reflecting the fact that Sir John Monash received no Australian awards or honours post 11 November 1918, the Prime Minister approve by government gazette publication the posthumous promotion of one step in rank of General Sir John Monash to the rank of Australian field marshal, with effect 11 November 1930, one year after Sir John Monash was eventually promoted to the rank of general.

In fact, Monash was recognised after November 1918 by the Australian Government, and was promoted to the full rank of general by the Prime Minister James Scullin in recognition of his long and distinguished service with the Australian military forces on Armistice Day 11 November 1929. On 14 April 2018, Neil James, Executive Director of the Australian Defence Association, suggested that posthumously promoting Monash was unnecessary and "would demean his record." James also wrote that the campaign to do so highlighted the problem of "emotive mythology about our military history." He pointed out that Harry Chauvel was the first Australian to command a division and become a corps commander, being promoted to lieutenant general a year before Monash. James added: "I have yet to meet or even hear of [a military historian] who supports the Monash promotion proposal". Three days after James' comments the Australian Prime Minister, Malcolm Turnbull, announced that Monash would not be promoted posthumously to field marshal.

See also
 1916 Pioneer Exhibition Game

References

Notes

Bibliography

Further reading
 
 
 

 Pegram, Aaron. (2019). " Monash, John", 1914-1918-online. International Encyclopedia of the First World War. Freie Universität Berlin. DOI: 10.15463/ie1418.11379.

External links

Sir John Monash (1865–1931) Gravesite at Brighton General Cemetery (Vic)

Monash, John (Sir) (1865–1931) National Library of Australia, Trove, People and Organisation record for John Monash
Monash, John (Sir) (1865–1931)  Australian War Memorial, digitized records for John Monash

1865 births
1931 deaths
Burials in Victoria (Australia)
Military personnel from Melbourne
Australian businesspeople
Australian civil engineers
Australian generals
Australian Jews
Australian people of German-Jewish descent
Australian military personnel of World War I
Engineers from Melbourne
Grand Officers of the Order of the Crown (Belgium)
Grand Officiers of the Légion d'honneur
Australian Jewish military personnel
Australian Knights Grand Cross of the Order of St Michael and St George
Australian Knights Commander of the Order of the Bath
Melbourne Law School alumni
People educated at Scotch College, Melbourne
Recipients of the Croix de guerre (Belgium)
Recipients of the Croix de Guerre 1914–1918 (France)
Recipients of the Distinguished Service Medal (US Army)
Vice-Chancellors of the University of Melbourne
Foreign recipients of the Distinguished Service Medal (United States)
People from West Melbourne, Victoria